The Vale–West Highway No. 451 is an Oregon state highway in Malheur County. Highway 451 is also designated as Oregon Route 451 (OR 451). 

The OR 451 designation was established in 2003 as part of Oregon's project to assign route numbers to existing named highways that previously were not assigned. , OR 451 is unsigned.

Route description

Highway 451 begins at a junction with US 20 at its crossing of the Malheur River southwest of Vale. The highway travels northwest on Canyon Road, briefly turning west and then north again, to reach Graham Boulevard. Highway 451 then turns east and continues into Vale, where it terminates at another junction with US 20.

History

The Vale–West Highway was designated as a state highway on November 13, 1931. OR 451 was assigned to the Vale-West Highway in 2003.

Major intersections

References

451
Transportation in Malheur County, Oregon
Vale, Oregon
2003 establishments in Oregon